Assassination is the killing of a prominent person, either for political or religious reasons or for payment. 

Assassination may also refer to:

 Assassination (1927 film), a silent German film directed by Richard Oswald
 Assassination (1964 film), a 1964 Japanese film directed by Masahiro Shinoda
 Assassination (1967 film), a 1967 Italian thriller-spy film
 Assassination (1987 film), a 1987 American film starring Charles Bronson
 AssassiNation, a 2006 album by death metal band Krisiun
 Assassination (2015 film), a 2015 South Korean film directed by Choi Dong-hoon

See also
 Assassin (disambiguation)